Euterpeinae is a palm tree subtribe in the tribe Areceae.

References

External links

 
Arecaceae subtribes